This is a list of Wings in the United States Air Force Air National Guard.

References

Air National Guard Wings
Units and formations of the Air National Guard